The Danubian Plain constitutes the northern part of Bulgaria, situated north of the Balkan Mountains and south of the Danube. Its western border is the Timok River and to the east it borders the Black Sea.

The Danubian Plain is contiguous with the Wallachian Plain (forming the Lower Danubian Plain), but the relief is hilly, featuring numerous plateaux and river valleys. The climate is markedly temperate continental with a weak Black Sea influence in the east. Precipitation is on average 450–650 mm a year. Important rivers include the Danube, the Iskar, the Yantra, the Osam, the Vit, the Rusenski Lom, the Ogosta and the Lom.

Among the major cities of the region are Varna, Rousse, Pleven, Dobrich, Shumen, Veliko Tarnovo, Vratsa, Vidin, Montana, Silistra, Targovishte, Razgrad, Svishtov  and Lom.

Minerals
In the Danubian Plain there is a wide variety of minerals, such as:
 Lignite (Lomski and Mareshki basin)
 Fireproof clay (Plevensko)
 Oil, Petroleum (Dolen and Goren Dabnik, Pleven; s. Tyulenovo to Shabla)
 Manganese  (Obrochishte, Carkva, Ignatievo)
 Copper ore (Belogradchik)

See also

 Northern Bulgaria
 Wallachian Plain

References
 

Plains of Bulgaria
Landforms of Varna Province
Landforms of Ruse Province
Landforms of Pleven Province
Landforms of Dobrich Province
Landforms of Shumen Province
Landforms of Veliko Tarnovo Province
Landforms of Vratsa Province
Landforms of Vidin Province
Landforms of Montana Province
Landforms of Silistra Province
Landforms of Targovishte Province
Landforms of Razgrad Province